K-11 or K11 may refer to:

 K-11 (film), a 2012 American prison drama
 K-11 (Kansas highway)
 K-11 (1927), a state highway in Kansas now numbered K-99
 K11 (Shanghai), an office building and shopping mall in Shanghai
 K-11 (sniper rifle), an Armenian sniper rifle
 K11 – Kommissare im Einsatz, a German television series
 K11 Art Foundation, a non-profit art foundation based in Hong Kong
 K11 Art Mall, a shopping centre in Hong Kong
 , a K-class submarine of the Royal Navy
 Kawanishi K-11, a Japanese carrier fighter aircraft
 LSWR K11 class, a British steam railcar
 Nissan Micra (K11), a Japanese hatchback
 S&T Daewoo K11, a South Korean assault rifle
 Sonata in G, K. 11, by Wolfgang Amadeus Mozart
 , a November-class submarine of the Soviet Navy